Maurice Cohen (1927—2006) was a manager of a post office branch in Israel, who attended to incoming telegrams of the Mossad. A common confusion is that Maurice was a cryptographer for Mossad. His older brother was the celebrated Israeli spy Eli Cohen. He stated that he discovered his brother's identity through his decryption work.

Born in Egypt to Syrian-born parents and living in Ramat Gan, Maurice spent his life commemorating his brother's legacy and appealing to bring back Eli Cohen's bones to burial in Israel, which Syria refuses to do. He died in December 2006.

External links
https://web.archive.org/web/20080705101407/http://www.jafi.org.il/education/actual/ecohen/index.html
Based on family memoirs and interviews, “The Eli Cohen Files” are the most extensive biography of Cohen, his career, and his family on the net.

1927 births
2006 deaths
Egyptian Jews
Israeli Mizrahi Jews
Egyptian emigrants to Israel